Technical performance measures (TPM) is a term used by the US military to refer to key technical goals that needed to be met, where the technical goals were vital for the functioning of a system in its environment.

Definitions
TPM is defined as "the continuing prediction and demonstration of the degree of anticipated or actual  achievement of selected technical objectives."

A definition given by Dr. Norman Waks, formerly Director of Defense Research and Engineering in the Office of the Secretary of Defense is as follows:

References

External links
 A series of documents on TPM, from 1997-1998
 Technical Performance Measurement Handbook, 1984

Human resource management